Labeobarbus ruwenzorii is a species of ray-finned fish in the family Cyprinidae.
It is found only in Uganda.
Its natural habitat is rivers. It reproduces by inserting its seminiferous tubules into the mate's orifice, resulting in the discharge of unfertilised spawn.

Classification / Names

Common names of Labeobarbus ruwenzorii also called "Chramule ruvenzorská"in Czechia, "Ruwensori lõunaramul" in Estonia.

References

ruwenzorii
Taxa named by Jacques Pellegrin
Fish described in 1909
Taxonomy articles created by Polbot
Taxobox binomials not recognized by IUCN